Canadian Express was a Canadian variety television series which aired on CBC Television between September 22, 1977 and September 12, 1980. The show was hosted by Ryan's Fancy in St. John's, Newfoundland and Labrador, Gabrielle in Edmonton, Alberta, Terry Jacks in Toronto, Ontario, Terry David Mulligan in Vancouver, British Columbia, Gerry and Ziz in Winnipeg, Manitoba and Jim Bennet in Halifax, Nova Scotia. It was executive produced by Paddy Sampson.

External links

 Canadian Express at the Canadian Communications Foundation
 Queen's University Directory of CBC Television Series (Canadian Express archived listing link via archive.org)

1977 Canadian television series debuts
1980 Canadian television series endings
CBC Television original programming
1970s Canadian variety television series
1980s Canadian variety television series